Joseph Masterson (29 January 1899 – 30 November 1953) was an English Roman Catholic Clergyman and sometime Archbishop of Birmingham.

Masterson was born in Ardwick, Manchester, England, the son of William Masterson, an Irish immigrant shopkeeper and his wife Celia. From 1910, he was educated at the Xaverian College, Rusholme until January 1915 when he was accepted as a student of the Diocese of Salford and continued his studies for a term at St Bede's College, Manchester, then at Douai School where he was captain of cricket and football.

He was ordained a priest on 27 July 1924 at the Cenacle Convent, Manchester. Following ordination he studied for two years at the English College, Rome. Returning to England in 1926 Fr Masterson served nine years as curate at St Mary's, Mulberry Street, Manchester, then five years as curate at The English Martyrs, Whalley Range. In 1940 he was appointed Parish Priest at St. Mary's of The Angels and St. Clare, Levenshulme.

He was elevated Archbishop of Birmingham on 8 February 1947 and was installed on 19 March 1947. His principal consecrator was Cardinal Bernard Griffin, co-consecrators Bishop of Salford Henry Vincent Marshall and Bishop of Soli Humphrey Bright. He remained in that post until his death on 30 November 1953.

Notes

1899 births
1953 deaths
20th-century Roman Catholic archbishops in the United Kingdom
People from Ardwick
People educated at St Bede's College, Manchester
People educated at Douai School
Clergy from Manchester
Roman Catholic archbishops of Birmingham
English College, Rome alumni